Home Brew also known as Home Brew Crew is a New Zealand hip hop group.

They released their self-titled debut full-length album in May 2012 to some critical acclaim. It hit number 1 on the New Zealand album charts in its first week, and is the first New Zealand hip hop album to top the charts since Scribe's album The Crusader in 2003.

In 2010 Home Brew were shortlisted for the New Zealand Music Awards Critics Choice Prize. In 2012 they won Best Urban / Hip Hop Album at the New Zealand Music Awards and were nominated for four others, including Best Group and Album of the Year.

One of their promotional videos, 'Police Stop Seven', has been criticized for condoning drunk-driving. In 2010 they also played at the Big Day Out.

In 2012, Massive Magazine wrote:"Their fun and often satirical take on hip-hop is no less pure or cultured because of that, and the well-rehearsed flows and crafted beats are the result of hours of hard work. This fact also makes them an impressive live outfit, and this reputation has seen them steadily become more in demand throughout New Zealand."In 2014, one of the band's performances at Lincoln University in Christchurch was shut down after one of its members allegedly punched an audience member in the face.

Discography

Awards

|-
| 2010
| Home Brew
| Critics' Choice Prize - NZ Music Awards 
| 
|-
| rowspan=5 | 2012 
| Home Brew
| Album of the Year -  NZ Music Awards 
| 
|-
| Home Brew
| Best Group - NZ Music Awards
| 
|-
| Home Brew
| Breakthrough Artist of The Year - NZ Music Awards
| 
|-
| Home Brew
| Best Urban / Hip Hop Album - NZ Music Awards
| 
|-
| Home Brew
| People's Choice Award - NZ Music Awards
| 
|}

References

External links
 Home Brew Crew's website 
 Home Brew on Bandcamp

New Zealand hip hop groups